San Mateo Piñas  is a town and municipality in Oaxaca in south-western Mexico. The municipality covers an area of 211.8 km². 
It is part of the Pochutla District in the east of the Costa Region.

As of 2005, the municipality had a total population of 2647.

References

Municipalities of Oaxaca